The EP Series, Volume 1: Acoustic Covers is an EP by Danish singer-songwriter Tim Christensen, released on 17 December 2012 as music download and as numbered 10" vinyl record, limited to 1000 copies. A Japanese CD version with three bonus tracks was released on 20 February 2013.

Overview 
In 2011–2013, Christensen recorded himself singing and playing guitar, using the built-in microphone and webcam of his laptop. These are known as the "Low Key/Late Night-sessions", referring to the low audio and video quality of the videos, and the time of recording, which was usually in the small hours of the night. The recordings were predominantly of Christensen's own material (released and unreleased), but also included a few cover versions, including "How Am I Supposed to Live Without You".

Inspired by these performances, Christensen recorded six cover songs in a very minimalistic and intimate way, featuring only Christensen singing and playing acoustic guitar. The last song is a duet with Irish singer-songwriter Gemma Hayes.

Reception 

The EP received few reviews, but the reviews that were written were moderately positive. One reviewer puts it as, "There is truly a 'campfire-deluxe' atmosphere over these takes on songs, that don't whip the carpet out from under the listener, but that surely do not irritate." Another review concludes with the words: "This EP is not a major release, but it is exactly what the title suggests. A nice little interlude, recorded without the heavy pressure of expectations that usually surrounds a Tim Christensen release."

Track listing

Personnel 
Tim Christensen and The Damn Crystals
 Tim Christensen – lead vocals, guitars, record producer
 Gemma Hayes – vocals (on "A Way to Say Goodbye")

Production
 Frank Birch Pontoppidan – engineer and mixer
 Kaal Odium – additional engineering
 Paul Wilson – artwork

Notes 

2013 EPs
Covers albums
Sony Music Denmark albums
Tim Christensen albums